The Battle of Taranto took place on the night of 11–12 November 1940 during the Second World War between British naval forces, under Admiral Andrew Cunningham, and Italian naval forces, under Admiral Inigo Campioni. The Royal Navy launched the first all-aircraft ship-to-ship naval attack in history, employing 21 Fairey Swordfish biplane torpedo bombers from the aircraft carrier  in the Mediterranean Sea.

The attack struck the battle fleet of the Regia Marina at anchor in the harbour of Taranto, using aerial torpedoes despite the shallowness of the water. The success of this attack augured the ascendancy of naval aviation over the big guns of battleships. According to Admiral Cunningham, "Taranto, and the night of 11–12 November 1940, should be remembered forever as having shown once and for all that in the Fleet Air Arm the Navy has its most devastating weapon."

Origins
Since long before the First World War, the Italian Regia Marinas First Squadron had been based at Taranto, a port-city on Italy's south-east coast. In the inter-war period, the British Royal Navy developed plans to counter the Italian navy in the event of a war in the Mediterranean. Plans for the capture of the port at Taranto were considered as early as the Italian invasion of Abyssinia in 1935.

After Italy's entry into World War II in 1940, British and Italian forces in North Africa engaged each other in the Western Desert Campaign. Italian troops based in Libya required a supply line from Italy. British troops, based in Egypt, suffered from much greater supply difficulties. Before Italy entered the war, British convoys had travelled across the Mediterranean, from Gibraltar via Malta to Egypt. However, the threat from the Italian navy and airforce made this very difficult. Instead, British ships steamed around the Cape of Good Hope, up the east coast of Africa, and then through the Suez Canal to reach Alexandria. 

Following the concept of a fleet in being, the Italians usually kept their warships in harbour and were unwilling to seek battle with the Royal Navy on their own, also because any ship lost larger than a destroyer could not be replaced. The Italian fleet at Taranto was powerful: six battleships (of which one was not yet battleworthy,  having her crew still in training after her reconstruction), seven heavy cruisers, two light cruisers and eight destroyers. This made the threat of a sortie against British shipping a serious problem.

During the Munich Crisis of 1938, Admiral Sir Dudley Pound, the commander of the British Mediterranean Fleet, was concerned about the survival of the aircraft carrier  in the face of Italian opposition in the Mediterranean, and ordered his staff to re-examine all plans for attacking Taranto. He was advised by Lumley Lyster, the captain of Glorious, that his Fairey Swordfish biplane torpedo bombers were capable of a night attack. Indeed, the Fleet Air Arm was then the only naval aviation arm with such a capability. Pound took Lyster's advice and ordered training to begin. Security was kept so tight there were no written records. Just a month before the war began, Pound advised his replacement, Admiral Andrew Cunningham, to consider the possibility. This came to be known as Operation Judgment.

The fall of France and the consequent loss of the French fleet in the Mediterranean (even before Operation Catapult) made redress essential. The older carrier, on Cunningham's strength, was ideal, possessing a very experienced air group composed entirely of the obsolescent Swordfish aircraft. Three Sea Gladiator fighters were added for the operation. Firm plans were drawn up after the Italian Army halted at Sidi Barrani, which freed up the British Mediterranean Fleet.

Operation Judgment was just a small part of the overarching Operation MB8. It was originally scheduled to take place on 21 October 1940, Trafalgar Day, but a fire in an auxiliary fuel tank of one Swordfish led to a delay.  auxiliary tanks were fitted in the observer's position on torpedo bombers - the observer taking the air gunner's position - to extend the operating range of the aircraft enough to reach Taranto. This minor fire spread into something more serious that destroyed two Swordfish. Eagle then suffered a breakdown in her fuel system, so she was removed from the operation.

When the brand-new carrier , based at Alexandria, became available in the Mediterranean, she took on board five Swordfish from Eagle and launched the strike alone.

The 24 attack Swordfish came from 813, 815, 819, and 824 Naval Air Squadrons. The small number of attacking warplanes raised concern that Judgment would only alert and enrage the Italian Navy without achieving any significant results. Illustrious also had Fairey Fulmar fighters of 806 Naval Air Squadron aboard to provide air cover for the task force, with radar and fighter control systems.

Half of the Swordfish were armed with torpedoes as the primary strike aircraft, with the other half carrying aerial bombs and flares to carry out diversions. These torpedoes were fitted with Duplex magnetic/contact exploders, which were extremely sensitive to rough seas, as the attacks on the German battleship  later showed. There were also worries the torpedoes would bottom out in the harbour after being dropped. The loss rate for the bombers was expected to be fifty per cent.

Several reconnaissance flights by Martin Marylands of the RAF's No. 431 General Reconnaissance Flight flying from Malta confirmed the location of the Italian fleet. These flights produced photos on which the intelligence officer of Illustrious spotted previously unexpected barrage balloons; the attack plan was changed accordingly. This reconnaissance flight alerted the Italian forces in southern Italy, but since they were without any radars, they could do little but wait for whatever came along. The Regia Marina could conceivably have gone to sea in search of any British naval force, but this was distinctly against the naval philosophy of the Italians between January 1940 and September 1943.

The complexity of Operation MB8, with its various forces and convoys, succeeded in deceiving the Italians into thinking only normal convoying was under way. This contributed to the success of Judgment.

The base of Taranto was defended by 101 anti-aircraft guns and 193 machine guns and was usually protected against low-flying aircraft by barrage balloons, of which only 27 were in place on 11 November, as strong winds on 6 November had blown away 60 balloons. Capital ships were also supposed to be protected by anti-torpedo nets, but  of netting was required for full protection, and only one-third of that was rigged before the attack due to a scheduled gunnery exercise.

Attack

The first wave of 12 aircraft, led by Lieutenant Commander Kenneth "Hooch" Williamson RN of 815 Squadron, left Illustrious just before 21:00 hours on 11 November 1940, followed by a second wave of nine about 90 minutes later. Of the second wave, one aircraft turned back as its auxiliary fuel tank detached from the aircraft ensuring the aircraft would not be able to complete the trip, and one launched 20 minutes late, after requiring emergency repairs to damage following a minor taxiing accident, so only eight made it to the target

The first wave, which consisted of six Swordfish armed with torpedoes, two with flares and four  bombs, and four with six bombs, was split into two sections when three of the bombers and one torpedo bomber strayed from the main force while flying through thin clouds. The smaller group continued to Taranto independently. The main group approached the harbour at Mar Grande at 22:58. Sixteen flares were dropped east of the harbour, then the flare dropper and another aircraft made a dive bombing attack to set fire to oil tanks. The next three aircraft, led by Lieutenant Commander K Williamson RN of 815 Squadron, attacked over San Pietro Island, and struck the battleship  with a torpedo that blasted a  hole in her side below her waterline. Williamson's plane was immediately shot down by the Italian battleship's anti-aircraft guns. The two remaining aircraft in this sub-flight continued, dodging barrage balloons and receiving heavy anti-aircraft fire from the Italian warships and shore batteries, to press home an unsuccessful attack on the battleship Andrea Doria. The next sub-flight of three attacked from a more northerly direction, attacking the battleship , hitting it with two torpedoes and launching one torpedo at the flagship, the battleship , which missed. The bomber force, led by Captain O. Patch RM, attacked next.

The second wave of eight aircraft, led by Lieutenant Commander J. D. Hale of 819 Squadron, was now approaching from a northerly direction towards the Mar Grande harbour, with two of the four bombers also carrying flares, the remaining five carrying torpedoes. Flares were dropped shortly before midnight. Two aircraft aimed their torpedoes at Littorio, one of which hit. One aircraft, despite having been hit twice by anti-aircraft fire, aimed a torpedo at Vittorio Veneto but the torpedo missed. Another aircraft hit the battleship  with a torpedo, blowing a large hole in her hull and flooding both of her forward magazines. The aircraft flown by Lieutenant G. Bayley RN was shot down by antiaircraft fire from the heavy cruiser  following the successful attack on Littorio, the only aircraft lost from the second wave. The final aircraft to arrive on the scene 15 minutes behind the others made an unsuccessful dive-bombing attack on one of the Italian cruisers despite heavy anti-aircraft fire, then safely returned to Illustrious, landing at 02:39.

Of the two aircraft shot down, the pilot and observer of the first (L4A), Lieutenant Commander K. Williamson, and Lieutenant N. J. 'Blood' Scarlett respectively, were taken prisoner. The pilot and observer of the second aircraft (E4H), Lieutenant G. Bayley and Lieutenant H. Slaughter, were both killed.

The Italian battleships suffered significant damage:
 Conte di Cavour had a  hole in the hull, and permission to ground her was withheld until it was too late, so her keel touched the bottom at a deeper depth than intended. 27 of the ship's crew were killed and over 100 more wounded. In the end, only her superstructure and main armament remained above water. She was subsequently raised, partially repaired and transferred to Trieste for further repairs and upgrades, but a changed situation put these works in low priority. She was still undergoing repairs when Italy surrendered, so she never returned to full service;
 Duilio had only a slightly smaller hole and was saved by running her aground;

 Littorio had considerable flooding caused by three torpedo hits. Despite underwater protection (the 'Pugliese' system, standard in all Italian battleships), the damage was extensive, although actual damage to the ship's structures was relatively limited (the machinery was intact). Casualties were 32 crewmen killed and many wounded. She was holed in three places, once on the port side, and twice on the starboard side ( and ). She too was saved by running her aground. Despite this, in the morning, the ship's bows were totally submerged.

Italian defences fired 13,489 shells from the land batteries, while several thousand were fired from the ships. The anti-aircraft barrage was formidable, having 101 guns and 193 machine guns. There were also 87 balloons, but strong winds caused the loss of 60 of them. There were also 13 aerophonic stations and 22 searchlights (the ships had two searchlights each). Denis Boyd, Commanding Officer HMS Illustrious, stated in his after-action report, "It is notable that the enemy did not use the searchlights at all during either of the attacks."

Littorio was repaired with all available resources and was fully operational again within four months, while restoration of the older battleships proceeded at a much slower pace (repairs took seven months for Duilio, and the repairs for Conte di Cavour were never completed). In all, the Swordfish attack was made with just 20 aircraft. Two Italian aircraft were destroyed on the ground by the bombing, and two unexploded bombs hit the cruiser  and the destroyer Libeccio. Near misses damaged the destroyer Pessagno.

Meanwhile, X-Force cruisers attacked an Italian convoy (Battle of the Strait of Otranto). This force had three cruisers (and ) and two s ( and ). Just past midnight, they met and destroyed four Italian merchantmen (Capo Vado, Catalani, Locatelli and Premuda), damaging the torpedo-boat Fabrizi, while the heavily out-gunned auxiliary cruiser Ramb III fled.

Cunningham and Lyster wanted to strike Taranto again the next night with Swordfish (six torpedo-bombers, seven bombers, and two flare-dispensers) – one wag in the pilots' room remarked, "They only asked the Light Brigade to do it once!" – but bad weather prevented the action.

Aftermath
The Italian fleet lost half of its capital ships in one night; the next day, the Regia Marina transferred its undamaged ships from Taranto to Naples to protect them from similar attacks, until the defences at Taranto (mainly the anti-torpedo nets) were brought up to adequate levels to protect them from further attacks of the same kind (which happened between March and May 1941). Repairs to Littorio took about four months, to Duilio seven months; Conte di Cavour required extensive salvage work and her repairs were incomplete when Italy surrendered in 1943. Cunningham wrote after the attack: "The Taranto show has freed up our hands considerably & I hope now to shake these damned Eyeties up a bit. I don't think their remaining three battleships will face us and if they do I'm quite prepared to take them on with only two." Indeed, the balance of power had swung to the British Mediterranean Fleet which now enjoyed more operational freedom: when previously forced to operate as one unit to match Italian capital ships, they could now split into two battlegroups; each built around one aircraft carrier and two battleships.

Nevertheless, Cunningham's estimate that Italians would be unwilling to risk their remaining heavy units was quickly proven wrong. Only five days after Taranto, Campioni sortied with two battleships, six cruisers and 14 destroyers to successfully disrupt a mission to deliver aircraft to Malta. The follow-up to this operation led to the Battle of Cape Spartivento on 27 November 1940. Two of the three damaged battleships were repaired by mid-1941 and control of the Mediterranean continued to swing back and forth until the Italian armistice in 1943.

However, measured against its primary task of disrupting Axis convoys to Africa, the Taranto attack had very little effect. In fact, Italian shipping to Libya increased between the months of October 1940 – January 1941 to an average of 49,435 tons per month, up from the 37,204-ton average of the previous four months. Moreover, rather than change the balance of power in the central Mediterranean, British naval authorities had "failed to deliver the true knockout blow that would have changed the context within which the rest of the war in the Mediterranean was fought."

A drum was attached beneath the nose of the aircraft, from which a roll of wire led to the nose of the torpedo. As it dropped, the tension from the wire pulled up the nose of the torpedo, producing a belly-flop rather than a nose dive.

Influence on Pearl Harbor
It is likely the Imperial Japanese Navy's staff carefully studied the Taranto raid during planning for the attack on Pearl Harbor, as both attacks faced similar issues attacking a shallow harbour. Japanese Lieutenant Commander Takeshi Naito, the assistant naval attaché to Berlin, flew to Taranto to investigate the attack firsthand. Naito subsequently had a lengthy conversation with Commander Mitsuo Fuchida about his observations in October 1941. Fuchida led the Japanese attack on 7 December 1941. More significant, perhaps, was a Japanese military mission to Italy in May 1941. A group of IJN officers visited Taranto and had lengthy discussions with their Italian Navy opposite numbers. However, the Japanese had been working on shallow-water solutions since early 1939, with various shallow ports as the notional targets, including Manila, Singapore, Vladivostok, and Pearl Harbor. In the early 1930s, as their Type 91 aerial torpedo entered service, the Japanese used a breakaway wooden nose to soften its impact with the water. As early as 1936, they perfected breakaway wooden fins for added aerial stability.

The Japanese attack on Pearl Harbor was a considerably larger operation than Taranto. All six Imperial Japanese fleet carriers, each one equipped with an air wing having over twice the number of planes of any British carrier, took part. It resulted in far more devastation: seven American battleships were sunk or disabled, and several other warships were destroyed or damaged. The U.S. Navy thereafter designed its fleet operations in the Pacific Ocean around its carriers instead of its battleships as capital ships. Battleships were found to be less useful in the expanses of the Pacific than in the confines of the Mediterranean; the older ships were too slow to escort the carriers and were chiefly used as fire support for amphibious operations.

Notes

References
 Bragadin, A, Italian Navy in World War II, 1st Ed, US Naval Institute, Annapolis, 1957. 
 Caravaggio, A.N, Lieutenant Colonel, 'The Attack at Taranto: Tactical Success, Operational Failure', Naval War College Review, 1997.
 
 Carlo Stasi, Otranto e l'Inghilterra (episodi bellici in Puglia e nel Salento), in Note di Storia e Cultura Salentina, anno XV, pp. 127–159, (Argo, Lecce, 2003),
 Carlo Stasi, Otranto nel Mondo. Dal "Castello" di Walpole al "Barone" di Voltaire (Editrice Salentina, Galatina 2018) ,
 Thomas P. Lowry, The Attack on Taranto (Stackpoole Books paperbacks, 2000)

Further reading
 Lamb, Charles To War in a Stringbag. Cassell and Collier Macmillan (1977) 
 Lowry, Thomas P. & Wellham, John W.G. The Attack on Taranto: Blueprint for Pearl Harbor. Stackpole Books (1995) 
 O'Connor, Christopher Patrick Taranto: The Raid, The Observer, The Aftermath. Dog Ear Publishing (2010) 
 Konstam, Angus Taranto 1940; The Fleet Air Arm's precursor to Pearl Harbor. Osprey Campaign Series #288. Osprey Publishing (2015)

External links

 La notte di Taranto – Plancia di Commando
 Order of battle
 IWM Interview with John Wellham, who piloted a Swordfish during the battle
 Battle of Taranto Diorama

Naval battles and operations of the European theatre of World War II
Allied naval victories in the battle of the Mediterranean
Naval aviation operations and battles
Naval battles of World War II involving Italy
Taranto
Aerial operations and battles of World War II involving the United Kingdom
Conflicts in 1940
1940 in Italy
History of Taranto
November 1940 events